The 2020–21 Wycombe Wanderers Football Club season was the club's 134th season in existence and the club's first season in the second division of English football. In addition to the domestic league, Wycombe participated in this season's editions of the FA Cup and the EFL Cup.

Players

Current squad

 Loan player

Transfers

Transfers in

Loans in

Transfers out

Loans out

Pre-season and friendlies
Wycombe Wanderers' first pre-season friendly was announced on 14 August 2020, playing West Ham United on 25 August 2020. A second pre-season friendly was announced on 21 August 2020 against Southampton Under-23s, played that day. A third friendly against Aston Villa for 29 August 2020 was confirmed via the club's Twitter account on 25 August 2020. On the same day, Chesham United's Chairman released a statement, confirming that they will replace their friendly with Banbury United with a game against a Wycombe XI on 11 September, the day before Wycombe would be starting their Championship season against Rotherham United.

Competitions

Overview

EFL Championship

League table

Results summary

Results by matchday

Matches
The EFL Championship fixtures were released on 21 August 2020.

FA Cup

The third round draw was made on 30 November, with Premier League and EFL Championship clubs all entering the competition. The draw for the fourth and fifth round were made on 11 January, conducted by Peter Crouch.

EFL Cup

The first round was split into 'northern' and 'southern' sections, with Wycombe Wanderers entered into the southern section. The first round draw was made on 18 August 2020.

Statistics

Appearances and goals

|-
|colspan="12"|Players who left the club before the end of the season:

|}

Notes

References

External links

Wycombe Wanderers F.C. seasons
Wycombe Wanderers F.C.